The 1994 Saarland state election was held on 16 October 1994 to elect the members of the Landtag of Saarland. The incumbent Social Democratic Party (SPD) government led by Minister-President Oskar Lafontaine was returned with a reduced majority and continued in office.

Parties
The table below lists parties represented in the previous Landtag of Saarland.

Election result

|-
! colspan="2" | Party
! Votes
! %
! +/-
! Seats 
! +/-
! Seats %
|-
| bgcolor=| 
| align=left | Social Democratic Party (SPD)
| align=right| 340,091
| align=right| 49.4
| align=right| 5.0
| align=right| 27
| align=right| 3
| align=right| 52.9
|-
| bgcolor=| 
| align=left | Christian Democratic Union (CDU)
| align=right| 265,871
| align=right| 38.6
| align=right| 5.3
| align=right| 21
| align=right| 3
| align=right| 41.2
|-
| bgcolor=| 
| align=left | Alliance 90/The Greens (Grüne)
| align=right| 38,087
| align=right| 5.5
| align=right| 2.9
| align=right| 3
| align=right| 3
| align=right| 5.9
|-
! colspan=8|
|-
| bgcolor=| 
| align=left | Free Democratic Party (FDP)
| align=right| 14,206
| align=right| 2.1
| align=right| 3.5
| align=right| 0
| align=right| 3
| align=right| 0
|-
| bgcolor=| 
| align=left | The Republicans (REP)
| align=right| 9,708
| align=right| 1.4
| align=right| 2.0
| align=right| 0
| align=right| ±0
| align=right| 0
|-
| bgcolor=|
| align=left | Others
| align=right| 20,917
| align=right| 3.0
| align=right| 
| align=right| 0
| align=right| ±0
| align=right| 0
|-
! align=right colspan=2| Total
! align=right| 688,880
! align=right| 100.0
! align=right| 
! align=right| 51
! align=right| ±0
! align=right| 
|-
! align=right colspan=2| Voter turnout
! align=right| 
! align=right| 83.5
! align=right| 0.3
! align=right| 
! align=right| 
! align=right| 
|}

Sources
 Landtagswahlen im Saarland seit 1945

1994
Saarland
October 1994 events in Europe